Gary J. Dilley (born January 15, 1945) is an American former competition swimmer and Olympic medalist.  He represented the United States at the 1964 Summer Olympics in Tokyo, where he received a silver medal in men's 200-meter backstroke, finishing second behind American teammate Jed Graef.  Dilley set new Olympic records in the heats and semifinals, but Graef improved upon Dilley's records in the event's second semifinal and final.

Dilley attended Michigan State University, where he swam for the Michigan State Spartans swimming and diving team.  Dilley graduated from the Indiana University School of Dentistry, went on to earn a doctorate in orthodontics from the University of North Carolina School of Dentistry and then specialized in pediatric dentistry and orthodontics.  He maintained his orthodontic practice in Cary, North Carolina, and was formerly a faculty member at the UNC School of Dentistry.

See also
 List of Michigan State University people
 List of Olympic medalists in swimming (men)

References

External links

 
  Dilley Orthodontics – Official website of Dilley Orthodontics

1945 births
Living people
American male backstroke swimmers
American male freestyle swimmers
Michigan State Spartans men's swimmers
Olympic silver medalists for the United States in swimming
People from Washington, D.C.
Swimmers at the 1964 Summer Olympics
Medalists at the 1964 Summer Olympics
Universiade medalists in swimming
Universiade gold medalists for the United States
Medalists at the 1965 Summer Universiade
20th-century American people